Ralph Gebstedt (born 8 October 1971) is an East German/German former ski jumper.

Career
On 24 March 1991 he won his only World Cup event in his career in Planica with personal best at 190 metres in the last round. After that jump Gebstedt said: "I had no problems at landing at all".

He participated in the Ski Flying World Championships in 1990, 1992 and 1996, his best finish being a fifteenth place from 1992. He won the Continental Cup in the 1993/94 season.

World Cup

Standings

Wins

References

External links

1971 births
Living people
German male ski jumpers